The AC 378 GT Zagato is a sports car designed by the Italian design company Zagato and built in South Africa by Hi-Tech Automotive. It was unveiled at the 2012 Geneva Motor Show. The design of the 378 GT was previewed in 2009 as the Perana Z-One, and is now badged as an AC Cars product.  Sales are expected to commence by the end of 2012. 

The car is powered by a  6.2 L V8 GM sourced engine found in the Chevrolet Camaro. Weighing , the car has a 0-100 kph acceleration time of 3.9 seconds and a top speed of around 298 kph. The car does not feature any electronic driver aids. 

The car was priced at around €109,990 for the coupe version.

References

378 GT Zagato
Rear-wheel-drive vehicles
Sports cars
Coupés
Cars introduced in 2012